Carolyn Ann Franklin (May 13, 1944 – April 25, 1988) was an American singer-songwriter. Besides her own musical success, Franklin was best known as the daughter of prominent Detroit preacher and civil rights activist C. L. Franklin and the younger sister of American singer/musician Aretha Franklin.

Biography
Franklin was born in Memphis, to Barbara (née Siggers) and Reverend C. L. Franklin. The youngest of the minister's six children, she moved to Buffalo, New York, shortly after her birth. Around 1946, the Franklin family settled in Detroit, where Carolyn would begin singing at her father's New Bethel Baptist Church.

Inspired by her sisters' successes in the secular music field in the early 1960s, Carolyn followed Erma and Aretha into a secular music career, first recording in 1963. Carolyn began recording for RCA Records in 1969 and remained with the label until retiring from the music industry in 1976. Like Erma's, Carolyn's modest success in the industry did not match Aretha's blockbuster breakthrough in the late 1960s. While struggling to release a hit, she began to work behind the scenes as a songwriter, mainly for sister Aretha's work. Aretha and Carolyn's bond led to several collaborations between the two, and Carolyn came up with several compositions that became classic hits, including "Ain't No Way", recorded in 1968. The ballad single was the B-side to Aretha's #1 R&B/Top Five Pop triumph, "(Sweet Sweet Baby) Since You've Been Gone". The song was strong enough to hit the R&B Top 10 and also went Top 20 on the Billboard Hot 100.
 
Carolyn's next hit for her sister was the 1973 ballad "Angel", which also featured Carolyn and eldest sister Erma Franklin in background voices advising Aretha. Aretha mentioned her sister's name in the beginning of the song in a monologue, describing how Carolyn came up with the song. Another track Carolyn contributed was 1970's "Pullin'" with Jimmy Radcliffe. Carolyn also wrote songs for Franklin's 1970 album Spirit in the Dark and her failed 1975 platter, You.

Franklin retired from the music industry in 1976, though she occasionally continued to sing with Aretha. Franklin appeared as one of Aretha's background singers in the 1980 movie The Blues Brothers, and was a backing vocalist on Paul King's 1987 album Joy.

Franklin died of metastatic breast cancer at Aretha's Scenic Court home in Bloomfield Hills, Michigan, on April 25, 1988, and – like other deceased family members – is interred at Detroit's historic Woodlawn Cemetery on North Woodward Avenue.

Discography

Baby Dynamite – 1969
Chain Reaction – 1970
The First Time I Cried – 1970
I'd Rather Be Lonely – 1973
If You Want Me – 1976
Sister Soul: The Best Of The RCA Years 1969–1976 – 2006

References

External links

 
 Carolyn Franklin's discography
 
 Carolyn Franklin bio

1944 births
1988 deaths
American soul singers
Deaths from breast cancer
Deaths from cancer in Michigan
Marygrove College alumni
People from Detroit
Burials at Woodlawn Cemetery (Detroit)
Singers from Detroit
African-American women singer-songwriters
20th-century African-American women singers
Singer-songwriters from Michigan